The genus Scarabaeus consists of a number of Old World dung beetle species, including the "sacred scarab beetle", Scarabaeus sacer and typical of the tribe Scarabaeini. These beetles feed exclusively on dung, which they accomplish by rolling a piece of dung some distance from where it was deposited, and burying it in order to feed on it underground.  They also prepare food for their larvae by excavating an underground chamber, and filling it with balls that have eggs laid in them. The growing larva feeds upon the dung ball, pupates, and eventually emerges as an adult.

A "scarabaeus" is also a now outdated term (OED 2) for an object in the form of a scarab beetle in art.  The scarab was a popular form of amulet in Ancient Egypt, and in ancient Greek art engraved gems were often carved as scarabs on the rest of the stone behind the main flattish face, which was used for sealing documents.

A creature identified as Scarabaeus appears in "The Gold-Bug" by Edgar Allan Poe, and a poem entitled "Scarabæus sisyphus" was created by Mathilde Blind.

Gallery

Subgenera and species
The following subgenera are accepted in BioLib:
 Ateuchetus Bedel, 1892
 Escarabaeus Zídek & Pokorny, 2011
 Kheper Janssens, 1940
 Mnematidium Ritsema, 1888
 Pachylosoma Zídek & Pokorný, 2008
 Pachysoma MacLeay, 1821
 Scarabaeolus Balthasar, 1965
 Scarabaeus Linnaeus, 1758
 incertae sedis
All species

 Scarabaeus acuticollis
 Scarabaeus aegyptiacus
 Scarabaeus aegyptiorum
 Scarabaeus aeratus
 Scarabaeus aesculapius
 Scarabaeus alienus
 Scarabaeus ambiguus
 Scarabaeus anderseni
 Scarabaeus andreaei
 Scarabaeus andrewesi
 Scarabaeus armeniacus
 Scarabaeus asceticus
 Scarabaeus babori
 Scarabaeus bannuensis
 Scarabaeus basuto
 Scarabaeus bennigseni
 Scarabaeus bohemani
 Scarabaeus bonellii
 Scarabaeus bornemizzai
 Scarabaeus brahminus
 Scarabaeus caffer
 Scarabaeus canaliculatus
 Scarabaeus cancer
 Scarabaeus carinatus
 Scarabaeus catenatus
 Scarabaeus cicatricosus
 Scarabaeus clanceyi
 Scarabaeus clericus
 Scarabaeus cognatus
 Scarabaeus confusus
 Scarabaeus convexus
 Scarabaeus cristatus
 Scarabaeus cupreus
 Scarabaeus cuvieri
 Scarabaeus damarensis
 Scarabaeus deludens
 Scarabaeus denticollis
 Scarabaeus devotus
 Scarabaeus dioscoridis
 Scarabaeus ebenus
 Scarabaeus endroedyi
 Scarabaeus erichsoni
 Scarabaeus festivus
 Scarabaeus fitzsimonsi
 Scarabaeus flavicornis
 Scarabaeus fraterculus
 Scarabaeus fritschi
 Scarabaeus funebris
 Scarabaeus furcatus
 Scarabaeus galenus
 Scarabaeus gangeticus
 Scarabaeus gariepinus
 Scarabaeus gilleti
 Scarabaeus glentoni
 Scarabaeus goryi
 Scarabaeus gracai
 Scarabaeus heqvisti
 Scarabaeus hippocrates
 Scarabaeus hottentorum
 Scarabaeus inoportunus
 Scarabaeus inquisitus
 Scarabaeus intermedius
 Scarabaeus interstitialis
 Scarabaeus intricatus
 Scarabaeus irakensis
 Scarabaeus isidis
 Scarabaeus jalof
 Scarabaeus janssensi
 Scarabaeus karlwerneri
 Scarabaeus karrooensis
 Scarabaeus knobeli
 Scarabaeus kochi
 Scarabaeus kwiluensis
 Scarabaeus laevifrons
 Scarabaeus laevistriatus
 Scarabaeus lamarcki
 Scarabaeus laticollis
 Scarabaeus licitus
 Scarabaeus lucidulus
 Scarabaeus multidentatus
 Scarabaeus namibicus
 Scarabaeus natalensis
 Scarabaeus nigroaeneus
 Scarabaeus nitidicollis
 Scarabaeus obsoletepunctatus
 Scarabaeus opacipennis
 Scarabaeus pabulator
 Scarabaeus paganus
 Scarabaeus palemo
 Scarabaeus parvulus
 Scarabaeus piliventris
 Scarabaeus pius
 Scarabaeus planifrons
 Scarabaeus platynotus
 Scarabaeus plausibilis
 Scarabaeus poggei
 Scarabaeus porosus
 Scarabaeus proboscideus
 Scarabaeus prodigiosus
 Scarabaeus puncticollis
 Scarabaeus pustulosus
 Scarabaeus radama
 Scarabaeus ritchiei
 Scarabaeus rixosus
 Scarabaeus rodriguesi
 Scarabaeus rotundigenus
 Scarabaeus rubripennis
 Scarabaeus rugosus
 Scarabaeus rusticus
 Scarabaeus sacer
 Scarabaeus sanctus
 Scarabaeus satyrus
 Scarabaeus savignyi
 Scarabaeus schinzi
 Scarabaeus scholtzi
 Scarabaeus schulzeae
 Scarabaeus semipunctatus
 Scarabaeus sennaariensis
 Scarabaeus sevoistra
 Scarabaeus silenus
 Scarabaeus spretus
 Scarabaeus striatus
 Scarabaeus subaeneus
 Scarabaeus sulcipennis
 Scarabaeus suri
 Scarabaeus tonckeri
 Scarabaeus transcaspicus
 Scarabaeus typhon
 Scarabaeus valeflorae
 Scarabaeus vanderkelleni
 Scarabaeus vansoni
 Scarabaeus variolosus
 Scarabaeus venerabilis
 Scarabaeus westwoodi
 Scarabaeus vethi
 Scarabaeus viator
 Scarabaeus vicinus
 Scarabaeus viettei
 Scarabaeus wilsoni
 Scarabaeus winkleri
 Scarabaeus xavieri
 Scarabaeus zagrosensis
 Scarabaeus zambezianus
 Scarabaeus zurstrasseni

References

External links

Scarabaeinae
Scarabaeidae genera